Damian Oko (born 22 January 1997) is a Polish professional footballer who plays as a centre-back for Zagłębie Lubin II.

References

External links

Polish footballers
Zagłębie Lubin players
Association football defenders
Ekstraklasa players
III liga players
IV liga players
1997 births
Living people
Poland youth international footballers